Tuataric acid is an organic compound and an unsaturated carboxylic acid.  This colourless compound was isolated in 2009 from the cloacal glands of the tuatara, a lizard-like reptile native to New Zealand.  Its formal name is (4E,6Z)-octa-4,6-dienoic acid, and it consists of an unusual pair of conjugated alkene units with the E and Z configurations.

Tuataric acid can be prepared from pent-4-yn-1-ol through a sequence that begins with the extension of the alkyne terminus by hydroboration and ends with the oxidation of the alcohol.

References

Carboxylic acids
Alkenoic acids